The flexor pollicis brevis is a muscle in the hand that flexes the thumb. It is one of three thenar muscles. It has both a superficial part and a deep part.

Origin and insertion
The muscle's superficial head arises from the distal edge of the flexor retinaculum and the tubercle of the trapezium, the most lateral bone in the  distal row of carpal bones. It passes along the radial side of the tendon of the flexor pollicis longus.

The deeper (and medial) head "varies in size and may be absent." It arises from the trapezoid and capitate bones on the floor of the carpal tunnel, as well as the ligaments of the distal carpal row.

Both heads become tendinous and insert together into the radial side of the base of the proximal phalanx of the thumb; at the junction between the tendinous heads there is a sesamoid bone.

Innervation
The superficial head is usually innervated by the lateral terminal branch of the median nerve. The deep part is often innervated by the deep branch of the ulnar nerve (C8, T1).

Blood supply
The flexor pollicis brevis receives its blood supply from the superficial palmar branches of radial artery.

Action
The flexor pollicis brevis flexes the thumb at the metacarpophalangeal joint, as well as flexion and medial rotation of the 1st metacarpal bone at the carpometacarpal joint.

Pathology 
Flexor pollicis brevis can, rarely, be completely absent at birth due to a congenital issue (as can the other muscles of the thenar eminence).

Additional images

References

Muscles of the upper limb